The Tigris is the eastern member of the two great rivers that define Mesopotamia.

Tigris may also refer to:

Astronomy
 13096 Tigris, an outer main-belt asteroid
 River Tigris (constellation), also known as Tigris, a constellation

Places
 The Bocca Tigris, a historical name for the Humen strait
 Tigris, Missouri, a community in the United States

Ships
 HMS Tigris, the name of a number of ships of the Royal Navy
  – any of several vessels by that name
 The reed boat Tigris used in Thor Heyerdahl's expedition

Other uses

 Cypraea tigris, or tiger cowrie, a type of sea snail 
 Einsatzgruppe TIGRIS, a Swiss police force
 Panthera tigris (tiger)
 Tigris, a character in The Hunger Games
 Tigris (roller coaster), a roller coaster at Busch Gardens Tampa

 Zilan Tigris, a Turkish singer

See also
Tigress (disambiguation)
Tigri, a town in India